J.R.R. Tolkien's The Lord of the Rings is the soundtrack to Ralph Bakshi's animated film adaptation of J.R.R. Tolkien's The Lord of the Rings, featuring music composed by Leonard Rosenman. It was issued as a double-LP in 1978. In 2001, the album was reissued on CD, with bonus tracks. The album reached No. 33 in the Canadian RPM Magazine albums chart, February 24, 1979.

Track listing

Original vinyl edition
Side 1:
Theme from "Lord of the Rings" (02:53)
History of the Ring (06:32)
The Journey begins / Encounter with the Ringwraiths (04:33)
Riders of Rohan (03:45)

Side 2:
Escape to Rivendell (06:22)
Mines of Moria (06:11)
The Battle in the Mines / The Balrog (05:11)

Side 3:
Mithrandir (03:20)
Gandalf remembers (02:22)
Frodo disappears (02:38)
Following the Orcs (03:16)
Attack of the Orcs (04:04)

Side 4:
Helm's Deep (07:02)
The Dawn Battle / Theoden's Victory (04:59)
The Voyage to Mordor / Theme from the "Lord of the Rings" (04:45)

CD reissue
History Of The Ring
Gandalf Throws Ring
The Journey Begins; Encounter With The Ringwraiths
Trying To Kill Hobbits
Escape To Rivendell
Company Of The Ring
Mines Of Moria
The Battle In The Mines; The Balrog
Mithrandir
Frodo Disappears
Following The Orcs
Fleeing Orcs
Attack Of The Orcs
Gandalf Remembers
Riders Of Rohan
Helm's Deep
The Dawn Battle; Theoden's Victory
The Voyage To Mordor; Theme From The Lord Of The Rings

References

External links
Allmusic.com
 discogs.com

The Lord of the Rings film music
1978 soundtrack albums
1970s film soundtrack albums
Fantasy Records soundtracks